West of Chicago is a 1922 American silent Western film directed by Scott R. Dunlap and starring Buck Jones, Renée Adorée and Philo McCullough.

Cast
 Buck Jones as Conroy Daly
 Renée Adorée as Della Moore 
 Philo McCullough as John Hampton 
 Sidney D'Albrook as English Kid 
 Charles K. French as Judson Malone 
 Marcella Daly as Patricia Daily 
 Kathleen Key as Señoria Gonzales 
 Harold Miller as Bud Moore

References

Bibliography
 Solomon, Aubrey. The Fox Film Corporation, 1915-1935: A History and Filmography. McFarland, 2011.

External links
 

1922 films
1922 Western (genre) films
Films directed by Scott R. Dunlap
American black-and-white films
Fox Film films
Silent American Western (genre) films
1920s English-language films
1920s American films